Albertina Martínez Burgos (March 14, 1981 - November 21, 2019) was a Chilean photojournalist.

Biography
Albertina Mariana Martínez Burgos was born March 14, 1981. She moved to Santiago from southern Chile in 2009 to pursue a career in photography. She worked at Chile's main daily, El Mercurio and later as a lighting assistant for the Chilean television channel Mega, and was also a freelance photojournalist. Martínez actively participated in demonstrating against the repression and abuses of the Carabineros de Chile towards the demonstrators as a result of the protests against the government of Sebastián Piñera in November 2019. She also covered "violence against women during protests". Her private Instagram showed photos of masked protestors in the week before her death.

Death
She was found dead in her apartment in Santiago on November 21, 2019, as a result of being stabbed and beaten. Her photography equipment was missing from her home. Her body was discovered by her boyfriend's mother after he was unable to contact her; with the help of a locksmith the mother was able to enter the apartment and found Burgos dead. The timing of her death and her missing equipment prompted suspicion that she was targeted because of her protest coverage. After her death, the photojournalist group Frente Fotograficó shared her pictures from the protests on social media with the hashtag #JUSTICIAPARAALBERTINA.

References

1981 births
2019 deaths
Photojournalists
People from Santiago
Assassinated Chilean journalists
Journalists killed in Chile
Chilean women journalists
Violence against women in Chile
Women photojournalists